Bastard Noise is an American noise band founded in 1991 by musicians Eric Wood, Henry Barnes, and W. T. Nelson. The project started as a type of sister band 
to the trio's previous group Man Is The Bastard. While Man Is the Bastard broke-up in late 1997, the Bastard Noise project continued and acts as Wood's current project.

Early recordings from the group's extensive discography were mostly self-released and predominantly featured only electronics and vocals. Since its formation, however, Bastard Noise has made releases with underground labels such as Three One G, Relapse Records, Gravity Records, Deep Six, Vermiform Records, Robotic Empire, among others.

During live performances, Wood often recruits other musicians to perform with him, the likes of which have included Merzbow, Justin Pearson, Keiji Haino and most recently Saira Huff. Instruments such as the bass guitar and the drum kit were later incorporated down the band's history. Wood has expressed distaste for digital piracy and prefers to release his music elusively on physical formats, although he has made few digital-only releases in the past.

References

External links

Discography at discogs.com
review of Rogue Astronaut at Tiny Mix Tapes
review of Endless Blockade at Punknews.org
review of The Axiom of Post Inhumanity at Spin
review of Imminent Economic Collapse at CMJ New Music Monthly

American experimental musical groups
Noise musical groups
American electronic musicians
Alien8 Recordings artists
Alternative Tentacles artists